Arnaud Monney (born 18 September 1981) is an Ivorian former footballer who played as a defender.

Career 
He began his career in 1994 at Académie de Sol Beni, before he was promoted in 2004 to ASEC Mimosas. He joined a Belgian club R.O.C. de Charleroi-Marchienne in July 2006 and then on 23 May 2007 switched to CS Sedan Ardennes.

References

External links 
 
 
 Footmercato Profile 

1981 births
Living people
Ivorian footballers
CS Sedan Ardennes players
R. Olympic Charleroi Châtelet Farciennes players
ASEC Mimosas players
Ligue 2 players
Footballers from Abidjan
Association football midfielders